Stuart Nisbet (January 17, 1934 – June 23, 2016) was an American character actor and former President of 
the Nesbitt/Nisbet Society of North America.

Early life
Born in Los Angeles, California, Nisbet studied theater at Los Angeles City College and California State University, Los Angeles.

Career
Nisbet guest starred on such television shows as Mama's Family; Murder, She Wrote; L.A. Law; Little House on the Prairie; Quincy, M.E. (in 2 episodes); Three's Company; McMillan & Wife; Emergency!; The Rockford Files; Kolchak: The Night Stalker; Happy Days; Adam-12 (in 2 episodes); Columbo (in 2 episodes); Cannon; Mannix (in 5 episodes); Night Gallery; Bonanza (in 9 episodes); Laredo, McCloud; The Partridge Family; Love, American Style (in 2 episodes); The Name of the Game; Dragnet (in 8 episodes); The Golden Girls; Get Smart (in 3 episodes); Mayberry R.F.D.; The Wild Wild West; The Monkees; Dundee and the Culhane, Mission: Impossible; Bewitched; My Three Sons; The Man from U.N.C.L.E.; The Fugitive; Gomer Pyle, U.S.M.C.; The Munsters; Dennis the Menace (as Mr. Wade), and The Dukes Of Hazzard.  Nisbet appeared in several roles in a total of 19 episodes of the western TV series The Virginian. He appeared in 6 episodes of Barnaby Jones and 9 of Bonanza.

For more than 20 years, Nisbet ran the Baker-Nisbet casting agency, which he co-founded, in Hollywood.

Death
Nisbet died on June 23, 2016, at Verdugo Hills Hospital in Glendale, California. He was 82. He was survived by his wife, children and grandchildren.

Filmography

References

External links

 Obituary - LA Times

1934 births
2016 deaths
American male film actors
American male television actors
Male actors from Los Angeles
People from Los Angeles